UPR may refer to:

Unfolded protein response, a biological response in the endoplasmic reticulum when some proteins did not properly fold.
Union Pacific Railroad, a freight railroad based in Omaha, Nebraska. 
Universal Periodic Review of the United Nations Human Rights Council
Unconditional positive regard, one of the three core conditions of Person-centered_therapy
Utah Public Radio, a radio station, part of the College of Humanities and Social Sciences at Utah State University.

Politics 
Unia Polityki Realnej, a political party in Poland
Popular Republican Union (1919) (UPR) was a Christian democratic party in Alsace, France during the Third Republic. Founded in 1919, the UPR became the dominant party in Alsace during the Interwar era.
Popular Republican Union of Gironde (French: Union Populaire Républicaine de la Gironde, UPR) was a Christian democratic party in Gironde, France during the Third Republic. 
Popular Republican Union (2007) (UPR) is a French political movement created by François Asselineau in 2007 and known for its patriotism and Euroscepticism. 
Progressive Union for Renewal (UPR), is a political party in Benin.
Union for Progress and Renewal, political party in Guinea
Ukrainian People's Republic, a short-lived independent Ukrainian state

University 
University of Palangka Raya, the public university in Palangkaraya, Indonesia
University of Puerto Rico, the public university system of Puerto Rico, or one of its 11 campuses:
University of Puerto Rico, Medical Sciences Campus
University of Puerto Rico at Aguadilla
University of Puerto Rico at Arecibo
University of Puerto Rico at Bayamón
University of Puerto Rico at Carolina
University of Puerto Rico at Cayey
University of Puerto Rico at Humacao
University of Puerto Rico at Mayagüez
University of Puerto Rico at Ponce
University of Puerto Rico at Rio Piedras
University of Puerto Rico at Utuado